Nephelemorpha is a monotypic moth genus of the family Erebidae. Its only species, Nephelemorpha semaphora, is found in Nigeria. Both the genus and the species were first described by George Hampson in 1926.

References

Endemic fauna of Nigeria
Calpinae
Monotypic moth genera